Timothy Brown, also known as Father MC, is an American rapper who achieved success in the early 1990s on the Uptown Records label.

Personal life
Born in Brooklyn, he grew up in Far Rockaway, Queens.

Father MC appeared in the August 1996 issue of Playgirl in a photospread taken by Greg Weiner.

Discography

Albums 
 Father's Day (1990)
 Close to You (1992)
 Sex Is Law (1993)
 This Is for the Players (1995)
 No Secrets (1999)
 Eat this Morning (2003)
 Fam Body (2010)

Songs 
 "Treat Them Like They Want to Be Treated" (1990)
 "I'll Do 4 U" (1990)  [US #20]
 "Lisa Baby" (1991)
 "I've Been Watching You"  (1991)
 "One Nite Stand" (1992)  [US #111]
 "Everything's Gonna Be Alright" (1992)  [US #37]
 "Innocent Girl"(1993) (ft. 4 Sure) [US #102]
 "Ï Beeped You" (1994)
 "Hey, How Ya Doin'" (1995)

References

Living people
Place of birth missing (living people)
African-American male rappers
21st-century American rappers
Year of birth missing (living people)
21st-century African-American musicians
People from Far Rockaway, Queens